This page details the all-time statistics, records, and other achievements pertaining to the New Orleans Pelicans.

Franchise records 

(As of the end of the 2020–21 season)

Bold denotes still active with team.

Italic denotes still active, but not with team.

Games played

Points

Rebounds

Assists

Steals

Blocks

Field goals

3-Pt Field goals

Free Throws

Individual awards

Rookie of the Year
Chris Paul – 2006

Most Improved Player
Brandon Ingram – 2020

Coach of the Year
Byron Scott – 2008

NBA Sportsmanship Award
P. J. Brown – 2004

All-NBA First Team
Chris Paul – 2008
Anthony Davis  – 2015, 2017, 2018

All-NBA Second Team
Chris Paul – 2009

All-NBA Third Team
Jamal Mashburn – 2003
Baron Davis – 2004
Chris Paul – 2011

NBA All-Defensive First Team
Chris Paul – 2009
Anthony Davis – 2018
Jrue Holiday – 2018

NBA All-Defensive Second Team
Chris Paul – 2008, 2011
Anthony Davis – 2015, 2017
Jrue Holiday – 2019

NBA All-Rookie First Team
Chris Paul – 2006
Darren Collison – 2010
Anthony Davis – 2013
Zion Williamson – 2020

NBA All-Rookie Second Team
Marcus Thornton – 2010
Herbert Jones – 2022

NBA All-Star Weekend
NBA All-Star selections
Jamal Mashburn – 2003
Baron Davis – 2004
Jamaal Magloire – 2004
David West – 2008–2009
Chris Paul – 2008–2011
Anthony Davis – 2014–2019
DeMarcus Cousins – 2018
Brandon Ingram – 2020
Zion Williamson – 2021, 2023

NBA All-Star Game Most Valuable Player
Anthony Davis – 2017

All-Star West Head Coach
Byron Scott – 2008

Franchise record for championships

References

Accomplish
National Basketball Association accomplishments and records by team